The Redalyc project (Red de Revistas Científicas de América Latina y El Caribe, España y Portugal) is a bibliographic database and a digital library of Open Access journals, supported by the Universidad Autónoma del Estado de México with the help of numerous other higher education institutions and information systems.

The project started in October 2002 with the general aim of building a scientific information system made up by the leading journals of all the knowledge areas edited in and about Latin America. Since its creation, its goal is: to give visibility to the scientific production generated in Ibero-America, that is underestimated worldwide due to various factors like low investment in science and technology, low participation of Latin American scientists in some of the main currents of science, as measured by percentage of articles by Latin American authors in established electronic databases e.g., MEDLINE, and the low impact of that production. Participation, measured by percentage of articles by authors of Latin America in such databases was very low in the dominant repositories e.g., 2.7% in the Science Citation Index (SCI).

As of 2015, Redalyc is an information system that also evaluates the scientific and editorial quality of knowledge in Ibero-America. A research group generates bibliometric indicators about the impact of the journals, authors and countries included in the journal electronic library. Redalyc has been consolidated as an important repository of knowledge with over 1,000 journals and more than 425,000 full-text articles.

Scientific Journal Electronic Library 

Organized in two main areas (social and natural sciences) and many specialised sub-sections, Redalyc gathers journals published in 15 countries, with over 550 journals and 16,000 articles available in PDF format, along with abstracts in Spanish and English languages, reference information, and other metadata. Similar to parallel projects such as Latindex, Redalyc fully embraces open access and releases its material under a Creative Commons license, making it free to download. Along with a keyword search on each page, users can browse the catalogue by title, author, country, or subject.

Countries 

Argentina, Brazil, Chile, Colombia, Costa Rica, Cuba, Ecuador, Spain, Mexico, Peru, Portugal, Puerto Rico, Dominican Republic, Serbia, Uruguay and Venezuela

Subjects

Social Sciences and Humanities 
Agrarian Studies, Anthropology, Art, Communication, Culture, Demography, Economy, Education, Environmental Studies, Geography, Health, History, Information Sciences, Language and Literature, Law, Multi-disciplinary studies, Philosophy and Science, Political Science, Psychology, Public Administration, Sociology and Territorial Studies

Natural and Exact Sciences 
Agrarian Science, Architecture, Astronomy, Atmospheric Sciences, Biology, Chemistry, Engineering, Geology, Geophysics, Information Technology, Mathematics, Medicine, Multidisciplinaries, Oceanography, Physics and Veterinary Medicine

Bibliometric indicators 

Bibliometric techniques have been shown to be useful in development of indicators of scientific research activity to address emerging concerns such as institutional level analysis of capabilities and networks. Bibliometric indicators have been used for policy purposes for nearly 25 years and were developed to address central concerns of classical science policy - level of research output and its impact. They are incorporated in regular statistical series such as the National Science Foundation's (NSF) science indicators and are used in high-profile analyses by leading scientists and policy makers.

Tools 
Redalyc database requires the submission of XML. This section lists the technologies that can be used for generating Redalyc XML.

Conversion

To Redalyc XML 

 MS Word documents & OpenOffice (LibreOffice) documents to Redalyc:
 Typeset: This tool provides a set of converters as a SaaS subscription model. MS-Word to SciELO XML.
 OxGarage and meTypeset: can convert documents from various XML formats
 Pandoc for Redalyc XML: Happens via MS-Word to Markdown (with some loss of context) to Redalyc.

From Redalyc XML 
This section describes the process of taking Redalyc XML as input, and using that to product multiple outputs.

 from Redalyc to HTML:
 JATS Preview Stylesheets (canonical XSLT conversion)
 Typeset Publisher Solution
 eLife Lens converts NLM XML to JSON for displaying using HTML and Javascript.
 from Redalyc to PDF:
 Typeset converter for Redalyc XML to PDF
 some JATS Preview Stylesheets, XSLT + XSL-FO conversion.
 from Redalyc to ePUB: (for mobile versions)
 eXtyles

Redalyc XML Editors 

 oXygen XML Editor
 Typeset XML Editor for Journals. Supports XML exports in compliant Redalyc Standards. Frequently used by editorial team to generate any kind of XML, PDF, HTML and ePUB. 
 PubRef "Pipeline": Browser-based realtime-preview XML editor

Usage indicators 

Redalyc produces indicator to keep track of the publications consultation. The statistics obtained are:

 Site use
 Articles report
 Visits report
 Consults comparatives
 Global use reports
 Internationalization index
 Individual reports
 Editorial reports
 Institutional reports

Controversy 

In July 2015, Jeffrey Beall, an American librarian, posted an article on his blog referring to the two largest Latin American open access databases (SciELO and Redalyc) as “favelas”, which is a derogatory Portuguese term for a slum. Beall stated: "Many North American scholars have never even heard of these meta-publishers or the journals they aggregate. Their content is largely hidden, the neighborhood remote and unfamiliar." This perspective was dismissed by Dr Luis Reyes Galindo, Cardiff University’s School of Social Sciences:"I suppose that by ‘North America’, Beall really means the United States of America and Canada, which... leaves at least one third of North America outside this myopic geography…

...SciELO and RedALyC are repositories centred on Iberoamerican scholarly literature, in which Spanish and Portuguese are the dominant languages. What is being suggested, it seems, is that Spanish and Portuguese scholars writing in their mother tongues should be deeply worried because English speakers are unlikely to read their work. Furthermore, we should also be ashamed of the quality of our work because a region that does not speak our language is uninterested in reading texts outside of their linguistic scope. This is analogous to suggesting that Gabriel García Márquez, Octavio Paz, Jorge Luis Borges and Machado de Assis should have been deeply disturbed because most ‘North American’ readers would’ve been uninterested in reading their works in the authors’ original mother tongues.”

Responding to the perceived ethnocentrism of Beall's published opinion of SciELO and Redalyc, a Motion was passed by the Brazilian Forum of Public Health Journals Editors and the Associação Brasileira de Saúde Coletiva (Abrasco, Brazilian Public Health Association), taking exception to Beall's characterization, drawing attention to the "ethnocentric prejudice", and correcting factual inaccuracies. The Motion draws attention to work by Vessuri, Guedon and Cetto emphasizing the value of SciELO and Redalyc to the development of science in Latin America and globally: “In fact, Latin America is using the OA publishing model to a far greater extent than any other region in the world… Also, because the sense of public mission remains strong among Latin American universities… these… initiatives demonstrate that the region contributes more and more to the global knowledge exchange while positioning research literature as a public good.”

In a critique to Beall's post, Dr. Antonio Sánchez Pereyra of the National University of Mexico wrote,  “SciELO and RedAlyC have received enough recognition far enough from Latin America that Beall’s opinion can be described as... at best, uninformed.”

Some indexed journals 
 Revista Austral de Ciencias Sociales
 Revista Colombiana de Estadistica
 Universitas Psychologica
 Geologica Acta
 Vojnotehnicki glasnik/Military Technical Courier

See also
 SciELO
 LILACS
 PubMed Central (PMC)
 Open access in Portugal
 Open access in Spain

References

Further reading 
Eduardo Aguado López, Rosario Rogel Salazar, Arianna Becerril García, and Honorio García Flores, "Redalyc OAI - PMH: the open archives initiative protocol for metadata harvesting (protocol version 2.0) " in International Conference on Dublin Core and Metadata Applications archive: Proceedings of the 2006 international conference on Dublin Core and Metadata Applications: metadata for knowledge and learning (Manzanillo, Colima, Mexico), Dublin Core Metadata Initiative: 2006, pages 244-252. 
Ricyt, (2002), El estado de la ciencia. Principales indicadores de ciencia y tecnología iberoamericanos / interamericanos 2001, Red iberoamericana de indicadores de ciencia y tecnología (Ricyt), Buenos Aires.
William Miller, Rita M. Pellen (2006), Evolving Internet References Resources, Binghamton.
Katz JS and Hicks D (1997). 'Bibliometric Indicators for National Systems of Innovation' prepared for IDEA project funded by TSER program of the EC, ESRC Centre on Science, Technology, Energy and Environment Policy Science Policy Research Unit, Brighton.
Narin, F. (1976). Evaluative Bibliometrics: The Use of Publication and Citation Analysis in the Evaluation of Scientific Activity, Cherry Hill.

External links 
 

Open-access archives
Aggregation-based digital libraries
Bibliographic databases and indexes
Geographic region-oriented digital libraries
Full-text scholarly online databases
Academic journal online publishing platforms
Multilingual websites
Mexican digital libraries